Universitet Vitebsk is a Belarusian women's football club from Vitebsk (Vitsyebsk). The holder of the club is, like the name suggests, the local university. The club is most known for its women's team, that won the Belarusian Premier League several times.

History
The club was founded in 1995. In a span of 8 years the women's team worked its way up into the Belarusian Premier League, where it won the title instantly and ended the year-long dominance of Babruichanka Babruisk.  In 2006–07 and 2007–08 the team reached the 2nd qualifying round of the UEFA Women's Cup.

In the 2009–10 UEFA Women's Champions League one started in the round of 32 but lost to FCR Duisburg.

Titles
 Belarusian women's championships: 2004, 2005, 2008, 2009
 Belarusian Women's Cup winners: 2005, 2006, 2007

Current squad
As of 8 October 2011

References

External links
Club at UEFA.com

Women's football clubs in Belarus
1995 establishments in Belarus
Association football clubs established in 1995